In enzymology, a cinnamoyl-CoA:phenyllactate CoA-transferase is an enzyme that catalyzes the chemical reaction

(E)-cinnamoyl-CoA + (R)-phenyllactate  (E)-cinnamate + (R)-phenyllactyl-CoA

Thus, the two substrates of this enzyme are (E)-cinnamoyl-CoA and (R)-phenyllactate, whereas its two products are (E)-cinnamate and (R)-phenyllactyl-CoA.

This enzyme belongs to the CoA-transferase family.  The systematic name of this enzyme class is (E)-cinnamoyl-CoA:(R)-phenyllactate CoA-transferase. This enzyme is also called FldA.

References

 

EC 2.8.3
Enzymes of unknown structure